This article lists all-time records for the National Lacrosse League, as well as the predecessors Major Indoor Lacrosse League and Eagle Pro Box Lacrosse League.

Franchise records
Through the end of the 2021-22 season

All time records

Championships won

Championship appearances

Playoff appearances

Overall record
Minimum 50 games played

Season records

Streaks

Longest winning streaks

Longest losing streaks

Player records
Through the end of season

All time leaderboards

Players listed in bold are still active

Games played

Goals

Average goals per game
Minimum 50 games required

Assists

Average assists per game
Minimum 50 games required

Total points

Faceoff wins

Loose balls

Penalty minutes

Goalie Saves

Season records

Single game records

Attendance records
Through the end of the 2013-14 season

All time records

Total attendance

Average attendance

Regular season records

Game records

Highest attendance

Lowest attendance

Other records

Notes and references

External links
 NLL Media Guide
 http://www.nll.com
 http://www.ilindoor.com/
 https://s3.amazonaws.com/nllassets/2015+NLL+Media+Guide.pdf

Sports competition records
Records